Icalma Airport is an airstrip  northeast of Icalma Lake, in the Araucanía Region of Chile.

The airstrip is in a generally mountainous region, and there is high terrain west of the runway.

See also

Transport in Chile
List of airports in Chile

References

External links
OpenStreetMap - Icalma
FallingRain - Icalma Airport

Airports in La Araucanía Region